Hadnock Halt railway station is a disused railway station on the Ross and Monmouth Railway which was only open for eight years, 1951 to 1959, closing when passenger services were withdrawn from the line. The platform still exists and the trackbed is part of a cycleway.

References

External links
 Station on 1952 OS Map

Railway stations in Great Britain opened in 1951
Railway stations in Great Britain closed in 1959
Railway stations opened by British Rail
Disused railway stations in Monmouthshire
Transport in Monmouthshire
History of Monmouthshire